In zoology, deep-sea gigantism or abyssal gigantism is the tendency for species of invertebrates and other deep-sea dwelling animals to be larger than their shallower-water relatives across a large taxonomic range. Proposed explanations for this type of gigantism include colder temperature, food scarcity, reduced predation pressure and increased dissolved oxygen concentrations in the deep sea. The inaccessibility of abyssal habitats has hindered the study of this topic.

Taxonomic range
In marine crustaceans, the trend of increasing size with depth has been observed in mysids, euphausiids, decapods, isopods and amphipods. Non-arthropods in which deep-sea gigantism has been observed are cephalopods, cnidarians, and eels from the order Anguilliformes.

Examples of deep-sea gigantism include the big red jellyfish, the giant isopod, giant ostracod, the giant sea spider, the giant amphipod, the Japanese spider crab, the giant oarfish, the deepwater stingray, the seven-arm octopus, and a number of squid species: the colossal squid (up to 14 m in length), the giant squid (up to 12 m), Onykia robusta, Taningia danae, Galiteuthis phyllura, Kondakovia longimana, and the bigfin squid.

Deep-sea gigantism is not generally observed in the meiofauna (organisms that pass through a 1 mm mesh), which actually exhibit the reverse trend of decreasing size with depth.

Explanations

Lower temperature
In crustaceans, it has been proposed that the explanation for the increase in size with depth is similar to that for the increase in size with latitude (Bergmann's rule): both trends involve increasing size with decreasing temperature. The trend with latitude has been observed in some of the same groups, both in comparisons of related species, as well as within widely distributed species. Decreasing temperature is thought to result in increased cell size and increased life span (the latter also being associated with delayed sexual maturity), both of which lead to an increase in maximum body size (continued growth throughout life is characteristic of crustaceans). In Arctic and Antarctic seas where there is a reduced vertical temperature gradient, there is also a reduced trend towards increased body size with depth, arguing against hydrostatic pressure being an important parameter.

Temperature does not appear to have a similar role in influencing the size of giant tube worms. Riftia pachyptila, which lives in hydrothermal vent communities at ambient temperatures of 2–30 °C, reaches lengths of 2.7 m, comparable to those of Lamellibrachia luymesi, which lives in cold seeps. The former, however, has rapid growth rates and short life spans of about 2 years, while the latter is slow growing and may live over 250 years.

Food scarcity
Food scarcity at depths greater than 400 m is also thought to be a factor, since larger body size can improve ability to forage for widely scattered resources. In organisms with planktonic eggs or larvae, another possible advantage is that larger offspring, with greater initial stored food reserves, can drift for greater distances. As an example of adaptations to this situation, giant isopods gorge on food when available, distending their bodies to the point of compromising ability to locomote; they can also survive 5 years without food in captivity.

According to Kleiber's law, the larger an animal gets, the more efficient its metabolism becomes; i.e., an animal's basal metabolic rate scales to roughly the ¾ power of its mass. Under conditions of limited food supply, this may provide additional benefit to large size.

Reduced predation pressure
An additional possible influence is reduced predation pressure in deeper waters. A study of brachiopods found that predation was nearly an order of magnitude less frequent at the greatest depths than in shallow waters.

Increased dissolved oxygen
Dissolved oxygen levels are also thought to play a role in deep-sea gigantism. A 1999 study of benthic amphipod crustaceans found that maximum potential organism size directly correlates with increased dissolved oxygen levels of deeper waters. The solubility of dissolved oxygen in the oceans is known to increase with depth because of increasing pressure, decreasing salinity levels and temperature.

The proposed theory behind this trend is that deep-sea gigantism could be an adaptive trait to combat asphyxiation in ocean waters. Larger organisms are able to intake more dissolved oxygen within the ocean, allowing for sufficient respiration. However, this increased absorption of oxygen runs the risk of toxicity poisoning where an organism can have oxygen levels that are so high that they become harmful and poisonous.

Gallery

See also
 Cephalopod size
 Dwarfing
 Island gigantism
 Insular dwarfism
 Largest organisms
 Megafauna

References

External links
 Science Daily: Midgets and giants in the deep sea

Animal size
Evolutionary biology concepts
Marine organisms
Ecogeographic rules